Alfredo Flores (born June 16, 1989) is an American director, videographer and photographer known for directing music videos and documentaries. He frequently collaborates with artists such as Justin Bieber, Ariana Grande, Karol G, Sabrina Carpenter, JoJo, Rihanna and Selena Gomez.

Flores made his documentary debut filming the 2011 concert film Justin Bieber: Never Say Never. He subsequently worked on Never Say Never's 2013 sequel Justin Bieber's Believe. Flores created the 2018 docuseries Ariana Grande: Dangerous Woman Diaries.

His most notable music videos include "Pray" and "Love Me" (Justin Bieber), "Santa Tell Me" (Ariana Grande), "About You" Blxst, "Monopoly" (Ariana Grande & Victoria Monét), "Stuck with U" (Justin Bieber & Ariana Grande), and "Games" (Cassie Steele).

Early life
Alfredo Flores grew up in Belleville, New Jersey. His mother came from San Sebastián, Puerto Rico. He attended New York Film School in 2007 before attending Santa Monica Film School. While in school, he interned with music video director Eric White. He subsequently worked as a production assistant on the music video for Chris Brown's "With You". He also filmed behind-the-scenes footage of the production of Mariah Carey's "Memoirs of an Imperfect Angel".

Career 
After moving from New York to Santa Monica, Flores began an internship at Geffen Records. He met Justin Bieber on the set of School Gyrls (2009) while shooting behind-the-scenes for director Nick Cannon, and agreed to shoot a behind-the-scenes video for Bieber. Flores subsequently collaborated with Bieber on various projects and later joined Bieber as tour videographer on his 2010 My World Tour. He directed the music videos for Bieber's 2010 singles "Love Me" and "Pray".

In 2011, Flores was tour photographer on Selena Gomez's We Own the Night Tour, and created a documentary series of the same name about the tour. He directed the music videos for the singles "Natural" and "All These Boys" by Jasmine V. In the same year, Flores was a videographer on Rihanna's Loud Tour.

In 2012, he joined Bieber's Believe Tour, and filmed the concert documentary Justin Bieber's Believe. Later that year, Flores and Katherine Brooks shared the award for "Best Director" at the 4th Shorty Awards. He was nominated again for "Best Director" at the 6th Shorty Awards in 2014, and won at the 7th Shorty Awards in 2015.

Flores photographed the cover art for Ariana Grande's 2015 single "Focus" while on her Honeymoon Tour as photographer and videographer. During these time he also developed the web series “Honeymoon Tour Diaries”.

In 2017, Flores was Ariana Grande's tour photographer on the Dangerous Woman Tour. In an interview with Refinery29, he discussed the events of the Manchester Arena bombing and Grande's decision to return for the One Love Manchester concert. He directed a four-part docuseries titled Ariana Grande: Dangerous Woman Diaries, which was released on November 28, 2018.

In 2018, he photographed the cover art for Troye Sivan's single "Dance to This", Nicki Minaj's "Bed", and Ariana Grande's "The Light Is Coming". The following year he photographed the cover art for Ariana Grande's 2019 album Thank U, Next.

Flores shot and directed Ariana Grande's rendition of "I Won't Say (I'm in Love)" as part of The Disney Family Singalong, which aired April 16, 2020. He also directed the music video for Stuck with U, a charity single by Bieber and Grande. The video won "Best Music Video From Home" at the 2020 MTV Video Music Awards. He was nominated for "Favorite Tour Photographer" in the 2020 iHeartRadio Music Awards for his work on the Sweetener Tour.

In 2021, he photographed Ariana Grande for her official The Voice portrait. He photographed the covert art singles for Bichota Mamiii Location and Sejodioto for Karol G as well as her promo images for her Bichota Tour.  He directed the music video for Inaya's Fallen  and the music video for the first single About You from R&B newcomer Blxst debut project.  
  
In 2022, he was nominated and won the Shorty Awards for "Best Live Streaming" for his Direction in the livestream telecast Pride Eve, hosted by Raven-Symoné and was the photographer for the 2022 Casa de Spotify pop up at the Latin Grammys

Awards

Videography

Filmography

References

External links 

 Alfredo Flores on IMVDB

American documentary filmmakers
American music video directors
1988 births
American cinematographers
Living people